Assistant District Attorney Claire Kincaid is a fictional character on the television series Law & Order, played by Jill Hennessy from 1993 to 1996. She appeared in 69 episodes (68 of Law & Order, and the Homicide: Life on the Street episode "For God and Country").

Character overview
Kincaid is introduced in the episode "Sweeps" as an Assistant District Attorney in the Manhattan DA's office. She is portrayed as an idealistic, outspoken feminist and agnostic who becomes increasingly disillusioned with her job. She is vocally pro-choice, opposes the death penalty, and has ambivalent feelings about drug prohibition. These political views often come into conflict with the realities of the legal system.  She graduated from Harvard Law School, where her stepfather Mac Geller (Len Cariou) had been one of her professors.

It is suggested throughout the fifth and sixth season that Kincaid and Executive ADA Jack McCoy (Sam Waterston) have a sexual relationship. However, it is not explicitly stated until season 9, long after the character had been killed in a traffic accident and exited the show.

Notable episodes
During her first season on the show, she is paired with Executive ADA Ben Stone (Michael Moriarty). During the prosecution of a rape case, he threatens to fire her after she fails to share key information she learned while interviewing a witness, which subsequently comes out in trial, jeopardizing the case.  Stone eventually relents and refuses to accept her resignation, relating to her because of a key mistake he made early in his career. In another case, Kincaid temporarily resigns after it is revealed she and a judge that the DA's office is prosecuting were once lovers, possibly jeopardizing the case against him.

After Stone resigns from the DA's office, she is paired with Jack McCoy (Sam Waterston), the new Executive ADA. In the two seasons they appear in together, she and the brash, competitive McCoy often butt heads over the social and political implications of their trial strategies, as well as McCoy's penchant for going to legal extremes to get a conviction. The two eventually form a close bond, however, and it is hinted in several episodes that they become lovers.

In the episode "Aftershock", Kincaid is killed just as she is considering leaving the DA's office; her car is struck by a drunk driver as she takes an inebriated Lennie Briscoe (Jerry Orbach) home from a bar. McCoy is haunted by her death, as evidenced by his intense, legally questionable efforts to prosecute a drunk driver and his indignation at being questioned about the circumstances of her death.  Following her death, Briscoe re-enters Alcoholics Anonymous and remains sober for the rest of his life; it is  implied that he feels his drinking was responsible for her death.

In one episode of Season 6, "Corpus Delicti", Kincaid was played by Jill Hennessy's identical twin sister, Jacqueline Hennessy, in certain courtroom scenes. This was because Jill was filming in Baltimore for the crossover episode of Homicide: Life on the Street, which was broadcast a few weeks later. Jacqueline Hennessy's performance was uncredited.

Jamie Ross (Carey Lowell) replaced Kincaid as McCoy's assistant.

Behind the scenes

The Kincaid character was written out after Hennessy expressed concern about being typecast as an "uptight lawyer".  Kincaid was originally intended to be portrayed as paralyzed and leaving the DA's office for private practice after the events of "Aftershock". This was eventually changed to Kincaid's death, which wasn't officially confirmed until Season 9. Hennessy rejects claims she refused to come back for a follow-up episode: "I made it clear I wanted to come back. I found out they killed me off from a friend who watched the show and told me, 'Jill, they said you were dead!' I was surprised, because I always thought I would return. Even now, I'd love to come back for some bizarre flashbacks."

References

Law & Order characters
Fictional assistant district attorneys
Fictional Harvard University people
Fictional lawyers
Television characters introduced in 1993
Crossover characters in television
American female characters in television
pt:Claire Kincaid